Bolshiye Vyoski is a rural locality (a village) in Andreyevskoye Rural Settlement, Alexandrovsky District, Vladimir Oblast, Russia. The population was 19 as of 2010.

Geography 
Bolshiye Vyoski is located 33 km northeast of Alexandrov (the district's administrative centre) by road. Malye Vyoski is the nearest rural locality.

References 

Rural localities in Alexandrovsky District, Vladimir Oblast
Alexandrovsky Uyezd (Vladimir Governorate)